Angel Camouflaged is a 2010 drama film directed by R. Michael Givens. It stars James Brolin, Dilana, Warrick Grier, Carlos Bernard and Patty Smyth.

Cast
James Brolin as Salt
Dilana as Scottie Ballantyne
Warrick Grier as Morgan
Carlos Bernard as Jude Stevens
Terry Serpico as Mr. Belial
Patty Smyth as Aunt Marie
Jordan Woods-Robinson as Kip
Marshall Tucker Band as Mustard A. Jones Band
Tessie Santiago as Desdemona
Cal Johnson as Balaclava Man
Violeta Leskyte Cucchiara as Valya

Awards and nominations

References

External links
 

2010 films
2010s English-language films
Films set in Charleston, South Carolina
2010 drama films
American drama films
2010s American films